Melitaea arcesia, the blackvein fritillary, is a butterfly of the family Nymphalidae. It is found from southern Siberia and Transbaikalia to the Amur region, Mongolia and China. The habitat consists of steppe-clad slopes.

Adults are on wing from June to August.

Subspecies
Melitaea arcesia arcesia (Transbaikalia)
Melitaea arcesia minor Elwes, 1899 (Altai)
Melitaea arcesia chuana Grum-Grshimailo, 1893
Melitaea arcesia sikkimensis Moore, 1901 (India)
Melitaea arcesia carmana Fruhstorfer, 1915 (Sayan)
Melitaea arcesia rucephala Fruhstorfer, 1915 (Tian Shan Mountains)

References

Butterflies described in 1861
Melitaea
Butterflies of Asia
Taxa named by Otto Vasilievich Bremer